Mahmut Orhan (born 11 January 1993) is a Turkish disc jockey and record producer. Orhan started working with music in Bursa at the age of 15 and would eventually move to Istanbul to work at a "Bebek" nightclub in 2011. He first experienced international success in 2015 with the instrumental song "Age of Emotions". One year later, his song "Feel" featuring Turkish singer and songwriter Sena Şener appeared on charts in Greece, Germany, Poland and Romania, among others. The song reached number one position on musical platform iTunes. In 2017 Mahmut released a remix of "Game of Thrones" and the song "Save me" with Romanian singer Eneli. Both songs gained significant success. In June 2018 he released a remix album titled  "One". Single of the album "6 Days", a remix of Colonel Bagshot's "Six Day War", reached number one in many countries such as Greece, Serbia, Romania and Bulgaria. Orhan has been part of some of the world's leading electronic music festivals, such as Exit Festival in Serbia and Untold Festival in Romania.

Discography

Extended plays

Singles

Awards 
 GQ Man of The Year 2017 - "Best Dj"
 Altın Kelebek 2018 - Best DJ
 Europaplus Best Track of Year 2016 Mahmut Orhan ft Sena Sener- FEEL

Notes

References

External links 
 Mahmut Orhan on Facebook

Turkish DJs
Turkish record producers
1993 births
Living people
People from Bursa